Anthony Thiessen (25 May 1942 – 3 September 2019) was an Australian rules footballer who played with Melbourne, Carlton and North Melbourne in the Victorian Football League (VFL).

Thiessen was a key forward, recruited to Melbourne from Sandy Bay. He made seven appearances in the 1963 VFL season and was then delisted, missing out on a chance to be part of Melbourne's 1964 premiership. After playing for Carlton in 1964, he was cleared to North Melbourne where he would be used as a midfielder. It was his only year at North Melbourne, which gave him the unusual distinction of having played with three separate clubs in a three-season career. He also played with the Waverley Football Club, in the Victorian Football Association.

James Thiessen, his son, was a member of Adelaide's 1998 AFL premiership team.

References

1942 births
Australian rules footballers from Tasmania
Melbourne Football Club players
Carlton Football Club players
North Melbourne Football Club players
Sandy Bay Football Club players
Waverley Football Club players
2019 deaths